Klondike (formerly Klondyke) is an unincorporated inhabited place in Dawson County, Texas, United States. It is located about 15 mi south of Lamesa, the county seat, at an elevation of 2884 ft (879 m) above sea level.

References

Unincorporated communities in Dawson County, Texas
Unincorporated communities in Texas